Ana Semren (born February 5, 1988) is a Croatian female professional basketball player.

External links
Profile at eurobasket.com

1988 births
Living people
Basketball players from Zagreb
Croatian women's basketball players
Centers (basketball)
Croatian Women's Basketball League players